Sharwin III, was the fourteenth ruler of the Bavand dynasty briefly in 986. He was the brother and successor of al-Marzuban.

Sharwin was the son of Rustam II. In 986, after the death of Rustam II, Sharwin's brother al-Marzuban ascended the Bavandid throne. There have been several confusions about the reign of the Bavandid kings after the death of Rustam II. In 986, al-Marzuban is no longer mentioned as the ruler of the Bavand dynasty, and Sharwin III is instead mentioned as the ruler of the dynasty. A certain Shahriyar III is later mentioned as the ruler of the Bavand dynasty in the following year. Nothing more is known about Sharwin III.

Sources 
 
 

Bavand dynasty
10th-century monarchs in Asia
10th-century Iranian people